Aglaothorax ovata, the ovate shieldback or ovate shield-back katydid, is a species of shield-backed katydid in the family Tettigoniidae. It is found in North America. They are 25-40 mm in length and tend to be green and yellow, sometimes with brown mottling. They have short wings and thick shields on their thorax. Adults are active in late summer and fall.

Subspecies
These six subspecies belong to the species Aglaothorax ovata:
 Aglaothorax ovata armiger Rehn & Hebard, 1920
 Aglaothorax ovata gigantea (Rentz & Birchim, 1968)
 Aglaothorax ovata longicaudus Rentz & Birchim, 1968
 Aglaothorax ovata ovata (Scudder, 1899)
 Aglaothorax ovata segnis Rehn & Hebard, 1920
 Aglaothorax ovata tinkhamorum Rentz & Birchim, 1968

References

Tettigoniinae
Articles created by Qbugbot
Insects described in 1899